Locmaria-Berrien is a former commune in the Finistère department of Brittany in north-western France. On 1 January 2019, it was merged into the commune Poullaouen.

Population
Inhabitants of Locmaria-Berrien are called in French Locberrienois.

See also
Communes of the Finistère department
Parc naturel régional d'Armorique

References

Former communes of Finistère